Egypt, represented by the Egyptian Olympic Committee, competed at the 2004 Summer Olympics in Athens, Greece from 13 to 29 August 2004. 97 competitors, 81 men and 16 women, took part in 48 events in 17 sports. Egypt's anthem, Bilady, Bilady, Bilady ("My Homeland, My Homeland, My Homeland") was played when Egypt won a gold medal.

Medalists

Archery

Athletics 

Egyptian athletes have so far achieved qualifying standards in the following athletics events (up to a maximum of 3 athletes in each event at the 'A' Standard, and 1 at the 'B' Standard).

Men

Women

Boxing 

Egypt sent six boxers to Athens.  They competed in the six heaviest weight classes, with no competitors in Lightweight or below.  Five of the Egyptian boxers won their first bouts on the team's way to a silver medal and two bronzes.  Their combined record was 10-6, with two of the losses coming from walkovers.  Egypt was 7th in the medal ranking for boxing.

Equestrian

Show jumping

Fencing

Mauro Hamza coached the team.

Men

Women

Field hockey

Men's tournament

Roster

Group play

9th-12th Classification Semifinal

11th-12th Place Final

Handball

Men's tournament

Roster

Group play

11th-12th Classification Final

Judo

Men

Women

Modern pentathlon

Rowing

Men

Women

Qualification Legend: FA=Final A (medal); FB=Final B (non-medal); FC=Final C (non-medal); FD=Final D (non-medal); FE=Final E (non-medal); FF=Final F (non-medal); SA/B=Semifinals A/B; SC/D=Semifinals C/D; SE/F=Semifinals E/F; R=Repechage

Shooting 

Men

Women

Swimming 

Men

Women

Synchronized swimming

Taekwondo

Water polo

Men's tournament

Roster

Group play

7th-12th Classification Quarterfinal

11th-12th Place Final

Weightlifting

Wrestling 

Men's Greco-Roman

See also
 Egypt at the 2005 Mediterranean Games

References

External links
Official Report of the XXVIII Olympiad
Egyptian Olympic Committee

Nations at the 2004 Summer Olympics
2004
Summer Olympics